Tiago Silva may refer to:

 Tiago Silva (footballer, born 1979), Bulgarian footballer who played as a defender
 Tiago da Silva (born 1985), Brazilian baseball pitcher
 Tiago Silva (footballer, born 1991), Portuguese footballer who plays as a full-back
 Tiago Silva (footballer, born 1993), Portuguese footballer who plays as a midfielder
 Tiago Silva (footballer, born 2000), Portuguese footballer who plays as a goalkeeper

See also
 Thiago Silva (disambiguation)